Perth was a constituency of the Scottish Parliament (Holyrood). It elected one Member of the Scottish Parliament (MSP) by the plurality (first past the post) method of election. Also, however, it was one of nine constituencies in the Mid Scotland and Fife electoral region, which still elects seven additional members, in addition to nine constituency MSPs, to produce a form of proportional representation for the region as a whole.

For the Scottish Parliament election, 2011, the constituency of Perth, was abolished and replaced by Perthshire North and Perthshire South and Kinross-shire.

Electoral region 

Up to 2011, the other eight constituencies of the South of Scotland region were Dunfermline East, Dunfermline West, Fife Central, Fife North East, Kirkcaldy, Ochil, Stirling and Tayside North.

The region covers all of the Clackmannanshire council area, all of the Fife council area, all of the Perth and Kinross council area, all of the Stirling council area and parts of the Angus council area.

Constituency boundaries and council area 

The  constituency was created at the same time as the Scottish Parliament, in 1999, with the name and boundaries of a pre-existing Westminster (House of Commons) constituency. The area has been covered by Westminster constituencies with differing names but similar boundaries since 1918, but in 2005 Scottish Westminster constituencies were mostly replaced with new constituencies. Most of the Perth Westminster constituency was merged into Ochil and South Perthshire. Part, including the city of Perth, was merged into Perth and North Perthshire.

The Holyrood constituency of Perth covered a central portion of the Perth and Kinross council area. The rest of the council area was covered by two Mid Scotland and Fife constituencies, Ochil and Tayside North, and one North East Scotland constituency, Angus.

The Ochil constituency, to the south of the Perth constituency, also covered the Clackmannanshire council area and a south-eastern portion of the Stirling council area.

Tayside North, to the north of the Perth constituency, also covered a northern portions of the Angus council area.

The Angus constituency, to the north-east of the Perth constituency, also covered a southern portion of the Angus council area and north-western and north-eastern portions of the City of Dundee council area.

Boundary review 

 See Scottish Parliament constituencies and regions from 2011 

Following their First Periodic review of constituencies to the Scottish Parliament in time for the next election in 2011, the Boundary Commission for Scotland proposed two newly drawn seats to replace Perth; these were to be known as Perthshire North and Perthshire South and Kinross-shire.

Constituency profile 
The constituency covered a combination of small prosperous towns and rich agricultural land. It  included the city of Perth and the towns of Bridge of Earn, Auchterarder, Crieff and Comrie. It was a relatively prosperous, largely rural, Lowland seat on the fringe of the Highlands, with successful livestock farming, fruit-growing and tourism interests. Unemployment is relatively low and half the electorate lived in the city of Perth itself.

At Westminster elections the area is traditionally Conservative, and Conservatives have held seats representing the area during most of the period since World War II. Scottish National Party (SNP) tradition is also strong in the area, however, and the SNP has contested every parliamentary election in the area in the same post war period. In the Perth and Kinross Westminster by-election in 1995, the SNP's Roseanna Cunningham won the Perth and Kinross Westminster seat from the Conservatives with an 11.5% swing. She then held the seat in the 1997 United Kingdom general election and went on to be elected to Holyrood in the 1999 Scottish Parliament election. She has represented the Scottish Parliamentary constituency and its equivalent successor constituency since. Before the constituency's abolishment at the British Parliament in 2005, the Perth Westminster constituency became the most marginal constituency in Scotland in 2001, with the SNP's Annabelle Ewing narrowly holding the constituency for the SNP, with the Conservatives missing out by 48 votes.

The constituency's successor seat of Perthshire South and Kinross-shire, established by the 2011 First Periodic Review of Scottish Parliamentary constituencies, was comfortably held by the SNP's Roseanna Cunningham at the 2011 Scottish Parliamentary election, who polled ahead of Conservative challenger Liz Smith by 22.96% of the vote. At the 2016 Scottish Parliamentary election there was a 9.5% swing in the constituency from the SNP to the Conservatives, with Elizabeth Smith missing out by just 3.93% of the vote.

Member of the Scottish Parliament

Election results

Footnotes 

Scottish Parliament constituencies and regions 1999–2011
1999 establishments in Scotland
Constituencies established in 1999
2011 disestablishments in Scotland
Constituencies disestablished in 2011
Politics of Perth and Kinross
Politics of Perth, Scotland
Auchterarder
Crieff
Bridge of Earn